The 1st Armored Car Squadron was a unit of the United States Marine Corps which was intended to utilise armored cars in combat.  The unit was formed in 1916 in Philadelphia under Marine Captain Andrew B. Drum, falling under the Headquarters of the then-new 1st Marine Regiment.

Inspired by the British Army's use of the Rolls-Royce Armoured Car, Franklin Roosevelt (then Assistant Secretary of the Navy) purchased two vehicles from the Armor Motor Car Company of Detroit.  These were tested, and six more King Armored Cars were acquired and assigned to the squadron.

The unit never saw combat, and was disbanded at Quantico in May 1921.

Sources
At Marines.com
Kenneth W. Estes. Marines under armor: the Marine Corps and the armored fighting vehicle, 1916-2000. Library of Naval Biography. Naval Institute Press, 2000. , . Pg 3 

Inactive units of the United States Marine Corps
Armoured car units and formations
Military units and formations established in 1916
Military units and formations disestablished in 1921
1916 establishments in Pennsylvania
1921 disestablishments in Virginia